The 1995 Virginia Tech Hokies football team represented Virginia Polytechnic Institute and State University during the 1995 NCAA Division I-A football season. The team's head coach was Frank Beamer. The Hokies finished the season 10–2 (6–1 Big East) and won the Sugar Bowl 28–10 over Texas.

Schedule

Rankings

Roster

Game summaries

Boston College

Cincinnati

Miami (FL)

Pitt

Navy

Akron

Rutgers

West Virginia

Syracuse

Temple

Virginia

1995 Sugar Bowl

References

Virginia Tech
Virginia Tech Hokies football seasons
Big East Conference football champion seasons
Sugar Bowl champion seasons
Lambert-Meadowlands Trophy seasons
Virginia Tech Hokies football